The men's 100 metres T52 took place in Stadium Australia.

There were two heats and one final round. The T52 is for athletes who have good function in their arms and hand but no function in their trunks and legs, have a spinal cord injury or similar disabilities.

Heats

Heat 1

Heat 2

Final round

References

Athletics at the 2000 Summer Paralympics